Yan, known in historiography as the Northern Yan (407 or 409–436), Eastern Yan or Huanglong, was a dynastic state of China during the era of Sixteen Kingdoms. Some historians consider Gao Yun, a member of the Goguryeo royal family, to be the first Northern Yan monarch, while others consider Feng Ba of Han ethnicity to be the founder.

Rulers of the Northern Yan

See also
Xianbei
List of past Chinese ethnic groups
Wu Hu

References 

 
Dynasties in Chinese history
Former countries in Chinese history
407 establishments
5th-century establishments in China
5th-century disestablishments in China